The England national cricket team toured the West Indies from January to March 1968 and played a five-match Test series against the West Indies cricket team which England won 1–0. England were captained by Colin Cowdrey; West Indies by Garfield Sobers.

Test series summary

First Test

Second Test

Third Test

Fourth Test

Fifth Test

References

1968 in English cricket
1968 in West Indian cricket
1967-68
International cricket competitions from 1960–61 to 1970
West Indian cricket seasons from 1945–46 to 1969–70